Kokoszka  is a village in the administrative district of Gmina Kłoczew, within Ryki County, Lublin Voivodeship, in eastern Poland.

The village has a population of 160.

References

Kokoszka